The women's 800 metres event  at the 2000 European Athletics Indoor Championships was held on February 26–27.

Medalists

Results

Heats
First 2 of each heat (Q) qualified directly for the final.

Final

References
Results

800 metres at the European Athletics Indoor Championships
800
2000 in women's athletics